Herbert Hopwood (1908 – 17 October 1996) was a British motorcycle designer.  He was, at least, partly responsible for some of the most influential designs for the British motorcycle industry and worked for Ariel, Norton, BSA and Triumph.

Motorcycle design career
Hopwood left school at an early age to work for Ariel under designer Val Page. Following Jack Sangster's purchase of Triumph in 1936, Hopwood moved there under Edward Turner and assisted with the design of the Triumph Speed Twin which influenced many motorcycles of the time and since.  His success led to an offer from rival manufacturer Norton in April 1947, where he designed the 500cc Norton Dominator engine. This came to a somewhat acrimonious end when the Technical Director, Joe Craig, refused to release the complete machine for production, despite Norton's financial situation. This was based on the allegation that the engine lacked power and the performance was below par as a result. It was subsequently produced with no alterations to the engine, after Hopwood had left the company.

In May 1948 he joined BSA, which subsequently purchased Triumph in 1951. April 1955 found him at Norton once more, still with Gilbert Smith as MD, but now under the aegis of AMC at Woolwich. When Gibert Smith retired in 1958, Hopwood and the financial director at Bracebridge Street, Alec Skinner, were allowed to get on with taking this part of AMC forward with much improved results. Together with Doug Hele, as Chief Engineer, good results were achieved. However this was to no avail, as the parent company was in a situation which absorbed all the modest profits made by Norton & Francis-Barnett, the only profitable members of AMC. With the AMC implosion imminent, both Hopwood and Hele left for BSA-Triumph. Recruited by Edward Turner in May 1961, supposedly as his successor, Hopwood was installed as Triumph Director and General Manager.

The Norton Dominator, BSA Golden Flash and the BSA Rocket 3/Triumph Trident motorcycles were amongst the best known Hopwood designs.

Writing career

Hopwood wrote Whatever Happened to the British Motor Cycle Industry which was published in 1981 by Haynes. A significant work of 315 pages with hundreds of illustrations, it was intended to provide a definitive account of the demise of the British motorcycle industry but has been described by reviewers as an "autobiography of Bert Hopwood, who attempts to distance himself from the events leading up to the industry's demise."

References

External links
Comments from his book on the collapse of the British motorcycle industry
Bert Hopwood and the Norton Dominator
Doug Hele on Bert Hopwood
Reference to the "late Bert Hopwood"

1908 births
British automotive engineers
British motorcycle pioneers
British motorcycle designers
1996 deaths